Hoppo! is the self-titled album from Café Tacvba frontman Rubén Albarrán.  The album consists of nine cover songs. These cover songs are Nueva Canción (or "new song" in English) Latin American folk songs written by South American social activists of the 1960s, including three from Violeta Parra.

Recording of the album was done in 2010, while Albarrán was on break from Café Tacvba. The album is also a departure from the alternative rock and electronic sounds that usually comprise Café Tacvba's music.

The album has not been commercially released, and there are no immediate plans to sign with a record label. The album was only available as a promotional CD in 2010. However, the songs can be streamed through HopPo's official MySpace page.

Track listing

Personnel
Rubén Albarrán – vocals
Rodrigo "El Chino" Aros – sitar, guitar, flute, percussion
Juan Pablo "El Muñeco" Villanueva – guitar
Carlos Basilio
Camilo Nu – bass guitar
Alejandro Flores – violin

References

External links
Café Tacuba Lead Singer Launches New Band (NPR article)
Monday Morning Musica : Rubén Albarrán y HOPPO! (VivirLatino article)
Rate Your Music Hoppo! album

2010 debut albums